Farid Essebar (born in 1987, known as Diabl0) is a Moroccan black hat hacker. He was one of the two people (along with Turk Atilla Ekici) behind the spread of the Zotob computer worm that targeted Windows 2000 operating systems in 2005. Among the affected were CNN, ABC News, The New York Times, Caterpillar, United Parcel Service, Boeing and also the United States Department of Homeland Security.

Microsoft used 50 investigators and had put a $250,000 reward for the capture of the hacker(s). Microsoft's General counsel declared on August 26, 2005 that "The fact that we were able to see these arrests in less than two weeks and see them halfway around the world really drives that point home."

Essebar is a Russian citizen, also.

Arrest

Intentions
It is believed that his intention was to facilitate credit card forgery scams. The FBI believes that Atilla Ekici paid Farid Essebar to code the worm.

Other accusations
In July 2006, investigators stated that Essebar may have authored more than 20 viruses.

2014 Arrest
On 17 March 2014, Essebar was arrested in Thailand after a 2-year investigation by Thai police. The investigation was triggered by a complaint from Swiss authorities over an alleged infiltration of a Swiss bank that caused dozens of billions of dollars' damage.

Trial
On September 15, 2006, a Moroccan court sentenced Essebar to two years of prison. It was reduced to a year on December 15, 2006.

Notes

1987 births
Living people
Computer criminals
Moroccan criminals